Spulerina malicola is a moth of the family Gracillariidae. It is known from Assam and Meghalaya, India.

The larvae feed on Malus domestica, Malus pumila, and Malus sylvestris. They probably mine the leaves or stems of their host plant.

References

Spulerina
Moths of Asia
Moths described in 1921